is a Japanese footballer currently playing as a defensive midfielder for Kawasaki Frontale. He is appointed as the captain of the team for 2023, following the departure of Shogo Taniguchi to Qatar side, Al-Rayyan.

Career statistics

Club
.

Notes

Honours

Club
J1 League: 2021
Japanese Super Cup: 2021

References

External links

1998 births
Living people
Sportspeople from Kagoshima Prefecture
Association football people from Kagoshima Prefecture
Toin University of Yokohama alumni
Japanese footballers
Association football midfielders
J1 League players
Kawasaki Frontale players